The 2012 Portland State Vikings football team represented Portland State University in the 2012 NCAA Division I FCS football season. They were led by third year head coach Nigel Burton and played their home games at Jeld-Wen Field. They are a member of the Big Sky Conference. They finished the season 3–8, 2–6 in Big Sky play to finish in a tie for 11th place.

Schedule

Source: Official Schedule
Despite also being a member of the Big Sky Conference, the game with North Dakota on September 8 was considered a non conference game and had no effect on the Big Sky Standings.

Game summaries

Carroll

@ North Dakota

@ Washington

Southern Utah

@ Northern Arizona

Idaho State

@ Cal Poly

@ UC Davis

Northern Colorado

@ Montana State

Eastern Washington

References

Portland State
Portland State Vikings football seasons
Portland State Vikings football
Portland State Vikings football